Hathaway is an unincorporated community in Rosebud County, Montana, United States. The community had a post office until July 29, 1995; it still has its own ZIP code, 59333.

The Northern Pacific Railroad established a section stop named Martin here in 1882. In 1883 the name was changed to honor Gen. Forrest Henry Hathaway.

References

Unincorporated communities in Rosebud County, Montana
Unincorporated communities in Montana